Ronny Heberson Furtado de Araújo (born 11 May 1986), known simply as Ronny, is a Brazilian former professional footballer who mainly played as a midfielder.

He signed with Sporting CP at the age of 20, but could never impose himself in the first team. Subsequently, he played several seasons with Hertha BSC, having joined in 2010.

Club career

Early years / Sporting
Born in Fortaleza, Ceará, Ronny began his professional career with Sport Club Corinthians Paulista, spending three seasons with the club but appearing mainly for the reserve team. After his contract ended in July 2006, he moved to Sporting CP.

Since joining Sporting, Ronny struggled to gain first-choice status: in the 2006–07 season, he battled with internationals Marco Caneira and Rodrigo Tello to finish with 12 Primeira Liga appearances, although he would score a memorable goal in an 88th minute 1–0 away win against Associação Naval 1º de Maio on 26 November 2006 – his free kick was unofficially measured according to some sources and YouTube at 211 km/h.

Ronny began the 2007–08 campaign as starter, but with the arrival in January of Leandro Grimi from A.C. Milan lost his position, playing just six games in his third year. For 2009–10, only being third or fourth-choice at Sporting, he was loaned to U.D. Leiria, recently returned to the top division.

Hertha BSC
At the end of the loan, after helping Leiria stay up whilst contributing with three goals, Ronny transferred to German second tier club Hertha BSC, where his older brother Raffael was also playing. He made his Bundesliga debut on 17 September 2011, coming on as a substitute for Patrick Ebert in the last minutes of a 2–2 home draw against FC Augsburg.

For 2012–13, Ronny moved into a more attacking midfield position, left vacant after his sibling's departure. He scored a career-best 18 goals precisely in that season, helping his team return to the top flight after one year out.

On 31 August 2016, Ronny and director of football Michael Preetz mutually agreed to terminate the former's contract one year in advance, after he became surplus to requirements under head coach Pál Dárdai.

Fortaleza
On 17 March 2017, more than one decade after leaving for Europe, 30-year-old Ronny returned to his homeland and signed with local Fortaleza Esporte Clube, choosing to wear jersey number 52 as an homage to his father Caetano, who had that age at the time and was also a footballer. Alongside seven other players, he left the club on 10 November.

Personal life
Ronny's older brother, Raffael, was also a footballer. An attacking midfielder, he represented most notably Borussia Mönchengladbach and Hertha, where the pair played together for two seasons.

Honours

Club
Sporting
Taça de Portugal: 2006–07, 2007–08
Supertaça Cândido de Oliveira: 2007, 2008

International
Brazil Under-17
FIFA U-17 World Cup: 2003

References

External links

1986 births
Living people
Sportspeople from Fortaleza
Brazilian footballers
Association football defenders
Association football midfielders
Campeonato Brasileiro Série C players
Sport Club Corinthians Paulista players
Fortaleza Esporte Clube players
Primeira Liga players
Sporting CP footballers
U.D. Leiria players
Bundesliga players
2. Bundesliga players
Hertha BSC players
Brazilian expatriate footballers
Expatriate footballers in Portugal
Expatriate footballers in Germany
Brazilian expatriate sportspeople in Portugal
Brazilian expatriate sportspeople in Germany